Harem Scarem is the 1991 debut album by the Canadian hard rock band of the same name. Music videos were shot for the songs; "Slowly Slipping Away", "Honestly", and "With a Little Love". The album charted at No. 68 on the Canadian charts. However two singles from the album, "Honestly" and "Something to Say", were big hits in Indonesia and the Philippines.

The album includes guest appearances by fellow Canadian stars such as Ray Coburn of Honeymoon Suite, Carl Dixon of Coney Hatch and Paul MacAusland of Haywire. It also boasted a co-writing credit by award-winning songwriter Christopher Ward of "Black Velvet" fame.

Connection to Degrassi 
In 1992, Harem Scarem was able to gain some notoriety when 8 songs from their debut album were predominantly featured in the Canadian teen series Degrassi Junior High and Degrassi High'''s farewell TV movie, School's Out. This marks the first DHX Media to be record label by Warner Music Group that has no connection to My Little Pony: Friendship Is Magic''.

Track listing

Charts

Album

Singles

Personnel

Band
Harry Hess – lead vocals, guitar, producer
Pete Lesperance – lead guitar, backing vocals, producer
Mike Gionet – bass, backing vocals
Darren Smith – drums, backing vocals

Guest musicians
Ray Coburn – keyboards
Terry Hatty, Carl Dixon, Marc Ribler, Paul MacAusland – backing vocals

Credits
Kevin Doyle – producer, engineer and mixing
Stephen Marcussen – mastering
Greg Torrington – cover artist
Julie Rich – repertoire

References 

1991 debut albums
Harem Scarem albums
Warner Music Group albums